Potassium hydrogen phthalate, often called simply KHP, is an acidic salt compound.  It forms white powder, colorless crystals, a colorless solution, and an ionic solid that is the monopotassium salt of phthalic acid. KHP is slightly acidic, and it is often used as a primary standard for acid–base titrations because it is solid and air-stable, making it easy to weigh accurately. It is not hygroscopic. It is also used as a  primary standard for calibrating pH meters because, besides the properties just mentioned, its pH in solution is very stable. It also serves as a thermal standard in thermogravimetric analysis.

KHP dissociates completely in water, giving the potassium cation (K+) and hydrogen phthalate anion (HP− or Hphthalate−)
 KHP + H2O → K+ + HP−
 
and then, acting as a weak acid, hydrogen phthalate reacts reversibly with water to give hydronium (H3O+) and phthalate ions.

 HP− + H2O  P2− + H3O+

KHP can be used as a buffering agent in combination with hydrochloric acid (HCl) or sodium hydroxide (NaOH). The buffering region is dependent upon the pKa, and is typically +/- 1.0 pH units of the pKa. The pKa of KHP is 5.4, so its pH buffering range would be 4.4 to 6.4; however, due to the presence of the second acidic group that bears the potassium ion, the first pKa also contributes to the buffering range well below pH 4.0, which is why KHP is a good choice for use as a reference standard for pH 4.00. 

KHP is also a useful standard for total organic carbon (TOC) testing.  Most TOC analyzers are based on the oxidation of organics to carbon dioxide and water, with subsequent quantitation of the carbon dioxide.  Many TOC analysts suggest testing their instruments with two standards:  one typically easy for the instrument to oxidize (KHP), and one more difficult to oxidize.  For the latter, benzoquinone is suggested.

References

Carboxylic acids
Phthalates
Potassium compounds